Leiocephalus carinatus armouri, commonly known as the Little Bahama curly-tailed lizard, is a subspecies  of Leiocephalus carinatus, the northern curly-tailed lizard. It was previously endemic to the Bahama Islands.

Etymology
The specific name, armouri, is in honor of Mr. Allison Vincent Armour, an American philanthropist, owner of the yacht, Utowana, used for scientific expeditions.

Geographic range
It was originally found only on Grand Bahama Island and the Abacos, but was released intentionally in Palm Beach, Florida in the 1940s. It has since spread, and now lives widely in southern Florida in addition to places in Bahamas.

References

Schwartz, A., & Henderson, R.W. (1991). Amphibians and Reptiles of the West Indies: Descriptions, Distributions and Natural History. Gainesville, Florida: University Press of Florida. .
Campbell, D.G. (1981). The Ephemeral Islands: A Natural History of the Bahamas. London and Basingstoke: Macmillan Education LTD.
Bahamas National Trust
Ardastra Gardens, Zoo and Conservation Center
 Florida's Exotic Wildlife

Further reading
Barbour, T., and B. Shreve. 1935. Concerning some Bahamian reptiles, with notes on the fauna. Proc. Boston Soc. Nat. Hist. 40 (5): 347–365. (Leiocephalus carinatus armouri, p. 360.)
Conant, R. 1975. A Field Guide to Reptiles and Amphibians of Eastern and Central North America, Second Edition. The Peterson Field Guide Series. Boston: Houghton Mifflin. xviii + 429 pp.  (hardcover),  (paperback). (Leiocephalus carinatus armouri, p. 108 + Plate 17 + Map 63.)

Leiocephalus
Endemic fauna of the Bahamas